Nothing Violates This Nature is the second album by American metalcore supergroup All Pigs Must Die. The album was released on 28 June 2013 through Southern Lord Recordings, produced by Kurt Ballou and recorded at Godcity Studios in 2013.

Track listing

Personnel
All Pigs Must Die
 Kevin Baker – vocals
 Ben Koller – drums
 Adam Wentworth – guitar
 Matt Woods – bass

Additional personnel
 Kurt Ballou – engineering
 Brad Bostright – mastering
 Aaron Turner – artwork, design

References

2013 albums
Southern Lord Records albums
All Pigs Must Die (band) albums
Albums produced by Kurt Ballou